David Konstan (born 1 November 1940) is an American classicist and academic, known for his work on notions of emotion and beauty in the ancient world. Currently a Professor of Classics at NYU, he previously spent three decades teaching at Brown University, where he remains John Rowe Workman Distinguished Professor Emeritus of Classics and Professor Emeritus of Comparative Literature.

He received his B.A., M.A., and Ph.D. degrees, all from Columbia University.

Bibliography 

One of his books has been reviewed in The Wall Street Journal.

Some of his books are:

 The Emotions of the Ancient Greeks: Studies in Aristotle and Classical Literature
 A Life Worthy of the Gods: The Materialist Psychology of Epicurus
 Before Forgiveness: The Origins of a Moral Idea
 Friendship in the Classical World
 Roman Comedy
 Sexual Symmetry: Love in the Ancient Novel and Related Genres
 Greek Comedy and Ideology
 Some Aspects of Epicurean Psychology
 Catullus' Indictment of Rome: The meaning of Catullus 64

References

External links
 http://classics.as.nyu.edu/object/DavidKonstan.html
 http://hellenic.as.nyu.edu/object/DavidKonstan.html
 https://vivo.brown.edu/display/dkonstan

1940 births
Living people
21st-century American historians
21st-century American male writers
New York University faculty

Brown University faculty
American male non-fiction writers
Columbia College (New York) alumni
Columbia Graduate School of Arts and Sciences alumni